Paphinia rugosa is a species of orchid endemic to Colombia.

Taxonomy 
The classification of this orchid species was published by Heinrich Gustav Reichenbach (1824–1889) in Linnaea; Ein Journal für die Botanik in ihrem ganzen Umfange, xli. 110, 1877  - Berlin, Germany. This species is found in Colombia, at an altitude of approximately 8000 feet.

Plant morphology

Flower morphology

References

External links 

rugosa
Endemic orchids of Colombia